Bradford City Association Football Club is an English professional football club in Bradford, West Yorkshire. The team competes in League Two, the fourth tier of the English football league system and are managed by Mark Hughes.

The club's home ground is the 25,136-capacity Valley Parade, which was the site of the Bradford City stadium fire on 11 May 1985, which took the lives of 56 supporters.

The club was founded in 1903 and immediately elected into the Football League Second Division. Promotion to the top tier followed as they won the 1907–08 Second Division title and then they went on to win the 1911 FA Cup Final, which remains the club's only major honour. They were relegated in 1922 and again in 1927, before winning the Third Division North title in 1928–29. Another relegation in 1937 did allow the club to go on to win the Third Division North Cup in 1939, however a further relegation followed in 1962 to leave the club in the newly created Fourth Division. They secured promotions back into the third tier in 1969 and 1977, but were relegated in 1972 and 1978. They found success in the 1980s under the stewardship of first Roy McFarland and then Trevor Cherry, winning promotion in 1981–82 and following this up with the Third Division title in 1984–85, though they were relegated out of the Second Division in 1990.

Bradford were promoted back into the second tier via the play-offs in 1996, before securing another promotion in 1998–99 to reach the Premier League, marking a return to the top-flight after a 77-year absence. They entered Europe and reached the semi-finals of the UEFA Intertoto Cup in 2000–01 but ended the campaign with relegation from the Premier League. A succession of financial crises followed as the club entered administration twice in two years and further relegations followed in 2004 and 2007 to leave the club back in the fourth tier. They found success under the management of Phil Parkinson by reaching the 2013 League Cup final and then going on to win that year's League Two play-off final but were relegated from League One in 2019.

They are the only professional football club in England to wear claret and amber, and have worn these colours throughout their history. They have though been known by various nicknames, with the "Bantams" being the most commonly used nickname as it appears on the current club crest. Supporters hold West Yorkshire derby rivalries with Huddersfield Town and Leeds United, as well as a historic Bradford derby rivalry with the now non-league side Bradford (Park Avenue).

History

Bradford City were formed in 1903 as a result of a series of meetings called by James Whyte, a sub-editor of the Bradford Observer, with Football Association representatives and officials at Manningham F.C., a rugby league side. The Football League saw the invitation as a chance to promote association football in the rugby league-dominated county of the West Riding of Yorkshire. It duly elected the new club into the Second Division, in place of Doncaster Rovers. Four days later, at the 23rd annual meeting of Manningham FC, the committee decided to change codes from rugby league to association football. Bradford City Association Football Club were formed without having played a game, taking over Manningham's colours of claret and amber, and their Valley Parade ground.

Robert Campbell was appointed the club's first manager and with the help of the new committee, he assembled a playing squad at the cost of £917 10s 0d. City's first game was a 2–0 defeat at Grimsby Town on 1 September 1903, six days before their first home game attracted 11,000 fans. The club finished 10th in their first season. Peter O'Rourke took over as manager in November 1905, and he led City to the Second Division title in 1907–08 and with it promotion to the First Division. Having narrowly avoided relegation in their first season in the top flight, City recorded their highest finish of 5th in 1910–11. The same season they won the FA Cup, when a goal from captain Jimmy Speirs won the final replay against Newcastle United. City's defence of the cup, which included the first Bradford derby against Bradford Park Avenue, was stopped by Barnsley after a run of 12 consecutive clean sheets.

City remained in the top flight in the period up to the First World War and for three seasons afterwards, but were relegated in 1921–22 along with Manchester United. Back in the Second Division, attendances dropped and City struggled for form, with five consecutive finishes in the bottom half of the table. They suffered a second relegation to the Third Division (North) in 1926–27. Two seasons later, O'Rourke, who had initially retired in 1921 following the death of his son, returned and guided City to promotion with a record haul of 128 goals. O'Rourke left for a second time after one more season, and although City spent a total of eight seasons back in the Second Division, they rarely looked like earning promotion back to the top flight. Instead in 1936–37, the club were relegated back to the Third Division (North). City won their third piece of silverware two seasons later, when they lifted the Third Division North Challenge Cup, but they were unable to defend the trophy because competitive football was suspended for the Second World War.

After the war, City went through two managers in the first two seasons, and were consistently in the bottom half of the Third Division (North) table until 1955–56. After three successive top half finishes, City were placed in the new national Third Division in 1958–59. Bradford spent just three seasons in the Third Division, but during their relegation season in 1960–61, they upset First Division side Manchester United in the inaugural season of the League Cup. With 34 goals from David Layne, City nearly earned promotion the following season 1961–62, but did also suffer a record 9–1 defeat to Colchester United. Layne left for Sheffield Wednesday, and without him City finished second from bottom of the league and had to apply for re-election. Bradford City just failed to win promotion in 1963–64, winning more games than any other team in the division that season, twenty five, with Rodney Green top scoring with 29 league goals. There followed three difficult seasons during which time manager Grenville Hair died following a heart attack in training, City returned to the Third Division after getting promoted in 1968–69. City's stay in the Third Division lasted just three years, when they finished bottom in 1971–72. Promotion via fourth spot was won again in 1976–77 but it was instantly followed by a relegation season.

City failed to win promotion for three successive seasons, until the board appointed former England centre back Roy McFarland as manager in May 1981. McFarland won promotion in his first season, but was poached by his former club Derby County just six months later. City won compensation from Derby and installed another England international Trevor Cherry as McFarland's replacement. Cherry, with former teammate Terry Yorath as his assistant manager, failed to win for two months, but eventually the pair guided City to safety from relegation. During the summer, however, the club chairman Bob Martin had to call in the official receivers. The club was saved by former chairman Stafford Heginbotham and former board member Jack Tordoff, but to ensure the club could start the new season, prize asset, striker Bobby Campbell was sold to Derby. City struggled but so did Campbell, and when he returned, the club went on a record run of ten successive victories. Although they missed out on promotion, City won the league the following season 1984–85, to return to the second tier of the Football League. However, City's triumph was overshadowed when the main stand at Valley Parade caught fire during the final game of the season, killing 56 people.

City played games away from Valley Parade for 19 months. But just ten days after the new £2.6 million ground was opened, Cherry was sacked. His replacement, Terry Dolan, steered City away from possible relegation, before he mounted a promotion challenge the following season. City went top of the table in September 1987, but fell away during Christmas and missed out on promotion on the final day of the season. Instead, they entered the play-offs but were defeated in the semi-finals by Middlesbrough. Two years later City were relegated back to the Third Division. For three seasons, City finished mid-table in the third tier, which was renamed Division Two following the formation of the Premier League in 1992.

In January 1994, Geoffrey Richmond came from Scarborough to take over as chairman, and promised to guide City to the Premier League within five years. He cleared the debts and after four months sacked manager Frank Stapleton to appoint his own manager, Lennie Lawrence. Lawrence left after little more than a year to join Luton Town but his successor, Chris Kamara, took City to the play-offs and their first game at Wembley Stadium. They defeated Notts County 2–0 in the final to earn promotion to Division One. City avoided relegation the following season by winning their last two league games, 1–0 against Charlton Athletic and then beating Queens Park Rangers 3–0 on the final day of the season, but Kamara was sacked in January 1998. Paul Jewell took over, initially on a temporary basis, before he was given a permanent contract. He bought the club's first £1 million signings and guided the club to the Premier League — the first time they had been in the top flight for 77 years — with a second-place finish. The following season, Jewell continued to defy the critics, who labelled his team Dad's Army, by avoiding relegation again on the last day with a 1–0 victory over Liverpool, with a goal from David Wetherall.

However, Jewell left shortly afterwards. His assistant Chris Hutchings was promoted to the manager's position, and despite a series of new expensive signings, he was sacked by November 2000, with City second from bottom of the league. Jim Jefferies took over but could not save the club from relegation. At the end of the first season back in Division One, City were placed in administration with debts of nearly £13 million. Two years later, the club suffered a second spell in administration and a second relegation. Two top-half finishes followed, but the club were relegated for a third time in seven seasons in 2006–07 meaning the following season would be their first in the bottom tier for 26 seasons. Former player Stuart McCall was appointed the new manager, and although he said anything less than promotion would be a failure, he later changed his mind after a poor start and finally led the team to a 10th-place finish. McCall eventually left Bradford City on 8 February 2010 following a board meeting after a run of poor results.

In September 2011, the club became linked with American amateur side SC United Bantams.

In January 2013, City became the first club from the fourth tier of English football since Rochdale in 1962 to reach the League Cup final, and the first fourth tier club ever to reach a major Wembley Cup Final. They defeated three Premier League sides en route to the final – Wigan Athletic 4–2 on penalties in the fourth round, Arsenal 3–2 on penalties in the quarter-finals and Aston Villa 4–3 on aggregate over the two legs of the semi-final. They met Premier League side Swansea City in the final at Wembley but lost 5–0.
The run to the final is thought to have been worth at least £1.3 million to the club, with joint chairman Mark Lawn stating that the final itself could be worth an additional £1 million, taking the club's total earnings to £2.3 million during their cup campaign. On 18 May 2013, the club returned to Wembley where they defeated Northampton Town 3–0 in the League Two Playoff Final to secure a place in League One for 2013–14.

On 24 January 2015, Bradford City caused an upset by beating Premiership leaders Chelsea 4–2 away in the FA Cup. The victory sent Bradford through to the fifth round for the first time in eighteen years. They beat Sunderland, another Premier League club, 2–0 at home in the next round on 15 February 2015. In the Quarter Finals, The Bantams faced Reading at home, in a game that ended in a goalless draw. The replay was played on 16 March 2015 at the Madejski Stadium, where Reading won 3–0.

The club was relegated to League Two in April 2019.

In December 2021, the club was approached by American investors known as WAGMI United (who use cryptocurrency and NFTs) about a possible buyout. The offer was rejected.

On 24 February 2022, Mark Hughes was appointed manager of the club on a contract until the summer of 2024.

Colours and club crest
Bradford City is the only professional football club in England to wear claret and amber. The club colours were inherited from Manningham FC, when the club converted to football upon Bradford City's foundation in 1903. However, whereas Manningham played in hoops, the new football club adopted claret and amber stripes. Manningham RFC adopted the colours in 1884 before the move to Valley Parade in 1886. Having originally worn black shirts with white shorts, the club's first game in claret and amber was against Hull on 20 September 1884, at Carlisle Road.

The reason Manningham chose claret and amber is not documented but the colours were the same as those of The Prince of Wales's Own West Yorkshire Regiment, which was based at Belle Vue Barracks on nearby Manningham Lane. Both Manningham, from 1886, and Bradford City, from 1903 to 1908, used the barracks as changing and club rooms.

Bradford City has worn claret and amber, with either white or black, since it was founded. Since the fire in 1985, the club has used black on the kit as a memorial to the 56 supporters who died. The club's away shirt has traditionally been white and to a lesser extent also blue, but there has been a profusion of other colours and designs particularly in more recent years. The away kit for the 2008–09 season was all white. For the 2009–10 season, the away kit was all black with a thin claret and amber stripe down the centre-left.

City scarves have also sold in large numbers in recent years to fans of Harry Potter, because the colours are the same as Harry's house scarf at Hogwarts School.

A number of other clubs across the world wear claret and amber. They include Scottish club Motherwell, who originally wore blue and white until they wore claret and amber for the first time on 23 August 1913, against Celtic. It is erroneously believed that Motherwell chose the claret and amber colours because they were the racing colours of Lord Hamilton; it is more likely that Motherwell were influenced by Bradford City's English FA cup win in 1911.

The club's crest combines a series of logos from over the years. In 1974, City adopted a contemporary style crest incorporating the club's initials, with a B-C logo. At the time, the new logo maintained the previous nickname of the Paraders. By December 1981, the club relaunched the Bantams as the official identity with a bantam on the new crest. The crest maintains the club colours and also includes the words The Bantams.

Nickname
Bradford City have had a number of nicknames during their history. In their early years, they were referred to as the Robins or Wasps, taking over the nickname of Manningham FC, as a result of Manningham's claret and amber hoops. Other nicknames have been the Citizens or Paraders, but the club is better known as the Bantams.

Stadium

Valley Parade was the site of a quarry on the hillside below Manningham, Bradford, owned by Midland Railway Company, in 1886, when Manningham RFC bought one-third of the land and leased the remainder, because they had been forced to find a new home. They spent £1,400 erecting a ground with a capacity of 20,000, club facilities and levelling the land. When Bradford City were formed in 1903, they took over the ground at Valley Parade, which was also at this time the headquarters of The 2nd West Riding Brigade Royal Field Artillery (Territorial Force), playing their first home game on 5 September 1903 against Gainsborough Trinity, drawing a crowd of 11,000. Five years later, the club won promotion to the First Division, and so commissioned football architect Archibald Leitch to redevelop the ground. The capacity was increased to 40,000 by December 1908 with a 5,300-seater main stand, a terraced paddock in front, a Spion Kop, and an 8,000-capacity Midland Road stand. Its first game against Bristol City on Christmas Day attracted a crowd of 36,000. On 11 March 1911, Valley Parade attracted its highest attendance 39,146, for an FA Cup game between Bradford City and Burnley during Bradford's FA Cup winning run.

Until 1952, by which time Bradford City had bought the remaining two-thirds of the ground to own it outright, the ground remained virtually unchanged. However, twice during the next decade, the club's Midland Road stand had to be demolished. Club officials first closed part of the stand in 1952, as a result of the Burnden Park disaster six years earlier. Its frame was sold to Berwick Rangers and a replacement stand built in 1954. Six years later, the new stand was itself demolished, and Valley Parade remained a three-sided ground until 1966, when the pitch was moved, and a new stand built.

On 11 May 1985, Valley Parade was the scene of a fatal fire, during which 56 supporters were killed and at least 265 were injured. The game was the final match of the 1984–85 season, before which City were presented with the Third Division championship trophy. The fire destroyed the wooden main stand in just nine minutes. The club played its home games at Odsal Stadium, a rugby league ground in Bradford, Elland Road, Leeds, and Leeds Road, the former home of Huddersfield Town, until December 1986, while Valley Parade was redeveloped. The club spent £2.6 million building a new main stand and improving the Kop and reopened the new ground on 14 December 1986 for an exhibition match against an England international XI.

In 1991, the Bradford end of the ground was the next to be redeveloped and was converted into a two-tier stand with a scoreboard. In 1996, following City's promotion to Division One, club chairman Geoffrey Richmond announced the construction of a 4,500 seater stand on the Midland Road side. Ahead of promotion to the Premiership in 1999, Richmond spent another £6.5 million to convert the Kop into a two-tier 7,500-seat capacity stand. A corner stand between the Kop and main stand was opened in December 2000, taking the capacity to 20,000 for the first time since 1970. The following summer, the main stand was also converted into a two-tier stand, taking the capacity to 25,136. Further projects were planned until the club went into administration in May 2002 so none have taken place. The following year, Valley Parade was sold to Gibb's pension fund for £5 million, with the club's offices, the shop and car park sold to London-based Development Securities for £2.5 million, but these (club offices, shop and car park) were bought back by the club's joint chairmen in the summer of 2011. The club's annual rent and maintenance costs to Gibb's pension fund is £1.2m, and so as of February 2009, the club is considering a return to Odsal. The club and Bradford Bulls would share the new £50m complex, which would also feature cricket, cycling and athletics facilities. Valley Parade has had several other names under sponsorship naming deals. In July 2016 it became the Northern Commercials Stadium, and in July 2019 it became the Utilita Energy Stadium. This partnership came to an end in July 2022. The University of Bradford subsequently became title sponsor of Valley Parade.

Supporters
The club spearheaded an initiative in 2007 to slash the price of watching professional football for the 2007–08 season. As a result, season tickets to watch Bradford City were the cheapest in England at £138, the equivalent of £6 per match. When the offer finished, the club confirmed the amount of season tickets sold was 12,019. The scheme enabled the club to top the average league attendances for Football League Two during the 2007–08 season, attracting more than three times more than any other club. The club won the Perform Best Fan Marketing campaign category in The Football League Awards for the scheme and earned them an invitation to the Houses of Parliament. The club aimed to attract 20,000 fans for the 2008–09 by offering a free season ticket to anyone buying a season ticket as long as 9,000 adults sign up, but they fell 704 short of the target. Joint-chairman Mark Lawn announced in November 2008 that season tickets in the Bradford End for the 2009–10 season would be available for just £99 and £138 for the rest of the ground if bought in December 2008.

For the 2015–16 season, the club announced its latest season ticket scheme aimed at continuing to make football affordable for fans. Season ticket prices were set at £149 for adults, senior citizens and students, while admission for under-11s was free when purchased with an adult ticket. An initial campaign target of 15,000 was set. On 6 July, the club announced a record-breaking 18,000 tickets had been sold following a successful campaign. The campaign was repeated for the 2016–17 season, where the club sold in excess of 17,000 tickets.

Bradford City have one official mascot, Billy Bantam.

Bradford City announced 'Own The Moment' 2022–23 season ticket sales of 14,190 in September 2022. The figure was a Sky Bet League Two record for the club. It surpassed the previous fourth-tier season-ticket sales record of 13,614 in 2019–20.

Rivalry

Bradford City have participated in the Bradford derby with city rivals Bradford Park Avenue. The West Yorkshire derby is held between City and local rivals Leeds United and Huddersfield Town. A "friendly" rivalry also existed with now-defunct club Halifax Town.

According to a survey conducted in August 2019, Bradford City fans also see Burnley, Barnsley and Oldham Athletic as rivals.

European football
Bradford City's only participation in European football to date came in the 2000 UEFA Intertoto Cup.

Players

Current squad

Out on loan

Player of the Year

Staff

Current staff

Former managers

  Robert Campbell (1903–1905)
  Peter O'Rourke (1905–1921)
  David Menzies (1921–1926)
  Colin Veitch (1926–1928)
  Jack Foster (Caretaker manager) (Jan–May 1928)
  Peter O'Rourke (1928–1930)
  Jack Peart (1930–1935)
  Dick Ray (1935–1937)
  Fred Westgarth (1938–1943)
  Bob Sharp (1943–1946)
  Jack Barker (1946–1947)
  Jack Milburn (1947–1948)
  David Steele (1948–1952)
  Albert Harris (Feb–May 1952) (interim manager)
  Ivor Powell (1952–1955)
  Peter Jackson (1955–1961)
  Bob Brocklebank (1961–1964)
  Bill Harris (1965–1966)
  Willie Watson (1966–1967)
  Grenville Hair (1967–1968)
 Jim McAnearney & Tom Hallett (Joint caretaker managers) (Mar–May 1968)
  Jimmy Wheeler (1968–1971)
  Ray Wilson (Player/caretaker manager) (Sep–November 1971)
  Bryan Edwards (1971–1975)
  Bobby Kennedy (1975–1978)
  John Napier (Feb–October 1978)
  George Mulhall (1978–1981)
  Roy McFarland (1981–1982)
  Trevor Cherry (1982–1987)
  Terry Dolan (1987–1989)
  Terry Yorath (1989–1990)
  John Docherty (1990–1991)
  Frank Stapleton (1991–1994)
  Lennie Lawrence (1994–1995)
  Chris Kamara (1995–1998)
  Paul Jewell (1998–2000)
  Chris Hutchings (June–Nov 2000)
  Stuart McCall (Player/caretaker manager) (Nov 2000)
  Jim Jefferies (2000–2001)
  Steve Smith (Caretaker manager) (December 2001)
  Nicky Law (2002–2003)
  Peter Atherton, Wayne Jacobs, David Wetherall and Dean Windass (player/caretaker managers) (November 2003)
  Bryan Robson (2003–2004)
  Colin Todd (2004–2007)
  David Wetherall (Player/caretaker manager) (Feb–May 2007)
  Stuart McCall (2007–2010)
  Wayne Jacobs (Caretaker manager) (February 2010)
  Peter Taylor (February 2010 – February 2011)
  Peter Jackson (March 2011 – August 2011)
  Colin Cooper (Caretaker manager) (August 2011)
  Phil Parkinson (August 2011 – June 2016)
  Stuart McCall (June 2016 – February 2018)
  Greg Abbott (Caretaker manager) (February 2018)
  Simon Grayson (February 2018 – May 2018)
  Michael Collins (June 2018 – September 2018)
  David Hopkin (September 2018 – February 2019)
  Martin Drury (Caretaker manager) (February 2019 – March 2019)
  Gary Bowyer (March 2019 – February 2020)
  Stuart McCall (February 2020 – December 2020)
   Mark Trueman and Connor Sellars (caretaker managers; December 2020–February 2021)
   Mark Trueman and Connor Sellars (February 2021 – May 2021)
  Derek Adams (June 2021 - February 2022)
   Mark Trueman (caretaker manager; February 2022)
   Mark Hughes (February 2022 – Present)

Honours and records

Honours

League
 English second tier (currently Football League Championship)
Winners (1): 1907–08
Runners-up (1): 1998–99
 English third tier (currently Football League One)
Winners (1): 1984–85
Play-off winners (1): 1995–96
 English fourth tier (currently Football League Two)
Runners-up (1): 1981–82
Promoted (2): 1968–69, 1976–77
Play-off winners (1): 2012–13
 Third Division (North)
Winners (1): 1928–29

Cup

 FA Cup
Winners (1): 1910–11
 Football League Cup
Runners-up (1): 2012–13
 Third Division North Challenge Cup
Winners (1): 1938–39
Runners-up (1): 1937–38
 West Riding County FA Challenge Cup
Winners: 1906, 1907, 1908, 1909

Records
 Record league victory: 11–1 v Rotherham United, Third Division (North), 25 August 1928
 Record FA Cup victory: 11–3 v Walker Celtic, First Round Replay, 1 December 1937
 Record League Cup victory: 7–2 v Darlington, Second Round Second Leg, 25 September 2000
 Record league defeat: 0–8 v Manchester City, Second Division, 7 May 1927 / 1–9 v Colchester United, Fourth Division, 30 December 1961
 Record FA Cup defeat: 1–6 v Newcastle United, Third Round, 7 March 1963 / 0–5 v Burnley, Fifth Round Replay, 3 February 1960 / 0–5 v Tottenham Hotspur, Third Round, 7 January 1970
 Record home attendance: 39,146 v Burnley, FA Cup Fourth Round, 11 March 1911
 Record gate receipts: £300,000 v Arsenal, Capital One Cup Quarter Final, 11 December 2012
 Longest unbeaten run : 21 1968 to 1969
 Longest run of wins: 10 1983 to 1984
 Most appearances : 574 Ces Podd
 Most league appearances: 502 – Ces Podd
 Most goals scored : 143 – Bobby Campbell
 Most league goals: 121 – Bobby Campbell
 Most goals in a season: 36 – David Layne, 1961–62
 Most goals scored in a match: 7 – Albert Whitehurst v Tranmere Rovers, Third Division (North), 6 March 1929
 Highest transfer fee paid: £2.5 million – David Hopkin, from Leeds United, July 2000
 Highest transfer fee received: £2 million – Des Hamilton, to Newcastle United, March 1997 / Andy O'Brien, to Newcastle United, March 2001
 Most team league goals in a season: 128 – Third Division (North), 1928–29
 Most points (three points for a win): 94 – Third Division, 1984–85
 Most points (two points for a win): 63 – Third Division (North), 1928–29

All records from Bradford City F.C. official website.

Sponsors

Kit and main sponsors

Tables of kit suppliers and shirt sponsors appear below:

Stadium
 1995–1999 The Pulse
 2005–2007 Bradford & Bingley
 2007 Intersonic
 2007–2016 Coral Windows
 2016–2019 Northern Commercials
 2019–2022 Utilita Energy
 2022–present University of Bradford

See also
 Football in Yorkshire

References

External links

 Official site
 Site of Bradford City's bantamspast museum
 Play-off record 

 
Association football clubs established in 1903
1903 establishments in England
Football clubs in England
Premier League clubs
English Football League clubs
Football clubs in West Yorkshire
FA Cup winners
Sport in Bradford
Companies that have entered administration in the United Kingdom